Dialineura anilis   is a species of ' stiletto flies' belonging to the family Therevidae.
It is a Palearctic species with a limited distribution in Europe

Description 
"Face bare ; frons hairy.Antennae with the basal
joint conspicuously incrassated. Wings with the fourth
posterior cell wide open. Abdomen of the male entirely clothed with
silvery pubescence, but the thorax light brown. Female without any
shining black frontal callus, and with the femora all orange.".

Biology
Habitat:Sand hills and dunes.

References

Therevidae
Insects described in 1761
Brachyceran flies of Europe
Taxa named by Carl Linnaeus